St Robert of Newminster Catholic School is a co-educational secondary school and sixth form located in Washington in the City of Sunderland, Tyne and Wear, England. The school is named after Saint Robert of Newminster. As a Catholic school it is under the jurisdiction of the Roman Catholic Diocese of Hexham and Newcastle.

Previously a voluntary aided school administered by Sunderland City Council, in July 2019 St Robert of Newminster Catholic School converted to academy status. The school is now sponsored by Bishop Wilkinson Catholic Education Trust.

St Robert of Newminster Catholic School offers GCSEs and BTECs as programmes of study for pupils, while students in the sixth form have the option to study a range of A Levels and further BTECs.

Notable former pupils
Jordan Pickford, goalkeeper for Everton and England
Ethan Robson, footballer
Paul Coughlin, cricketer
Bridget Phillipson, Labour Party Member of Parliament (MP) for Houghton and Sunderland South (2010–present)
Si King, Hairy Bikers member
Paul Thirlwell, footballer
James Roddam, chef
Carl Magnay, footballer
Matthew Potts, cricketer

References

External links
St Robert of Newminster Catholic School official website

Secondary schools in the City of Sunderland
Catholic secondary schools in the Diocese of Hexham and Newcastle
Academies in the City of Sunderland
International Baccalaureate schools in England
Washington, Tyne and Wear